Northeast Malakula, or Uripiv-Wala-Rano-Atchin, is a dialect chain spoken on the islands of Uripiv, Wala, Rano, and Atchin and on the mainland opposite to these islands. Uripiv-Wala-Rano-Atchin is spoken today by about 9,000 people. Literacy rate of its speakers in their own language is 10–30%.

Uripiv-Wala-Rano-Atchin forms a dialect chain. The Uripiv dialect is the most southerly of these and has 85% of its words in common with Atchin, the most northerly dialect. Uripiv is spoken on the north-east coast of Malakula. 

The Uripiv dialect is one of the few documented languages that use the rare bilabial trill, a feature that is not found in the Atchin dialect.

References

Further reading
Duhamel, Marie (2015) Ethnolinguistic vitality of the language of Atchin, central Vanuatu: A survey of the language's status, institutional support and demography. Fourth International Workshop on the Sociolinguistics of Language Endangerment. Payap University.

Malekula languages
Languages of Vanuatu